Kağan Aydın Çelebi (born 2003) is a Turkish FIDE Master (FM) (2013).

Biography
Kağan Aydın Çelebi repeatedly represented Turkey at the European Youth Chess Championships and World Youth Chess Championships in different age groups. In 2013, in Budva he won the European Youth Chess Championship in the U10 age group. In 2012, Kağan Aydın Çelebi won a bronze medal in the European School Chess Championship in the U09 age group. In 2014, he won a silver medal in the European School Chess Championship in the U11 age group.

In 2012, Kağan Aydın Çelebi played for Turkey's team C at the second board in the 40th Chess Olympiad in Istanbul (where Turkey, as the host country, had three teams); his results were (+2, =2, -5).

References

External links

Kağan Aydın Çelebi chess games at 365chess.com

2003 births
Living people
Turkish chess players
Chess FIDE Masters
Chess Olympiad competitors